Khiarak (also Turkish as Xiarai and Khiarai; also known as Xiarai) is a village in Sardabeh Rural District of the Central District of Ardabil County, Ardabil province, Iran. At the 2006 census, its population was 3,183 in 709 households. The following census in 2011 counted 3,353 people in 851 households. The latest census in 2016 showed a population of 3,287 people in 886 households; it is the largest village in its rural district.

References 

Ardabil County

Towns and villages in Ardabil County

Populated places in Ardabil Province

Populated places in Ardabil County